was a Japanese physician and physiologist.

Hashida was born in Tottori in 1882. He became a medical professor of Tokyo Imperial University. He also became the Headmaster of the First Higher School in 1937.

He served as the Minister of Education from 1940 to 1943 under the Konoe and Tōjō cabinets.  After World War II, Hashida came under suspicion of war crimes committed during his tenure as minister during the war. Hashida denied wrongdoing and committed suicide by taking potassium cyanide.

References

1882 births
1945 suicides
University of Tokyo alumni
Academic staff of the University of Tokyo
Japanese physiologists
Education ministers of Japan
Suicides by poison in Japan
Suicides by cyanide poisoning
Japanese politicians who committed suicide